The 1961 Delaware State Hornets football team represented Delaware State College—now known as Delaware State University—as a member of the Central Intercollegiate Athletic Association (CIAA) in the 1961 NCAA College Division football season. Led by coach Roy D. Moore in his second season, the Hornets compiled a 6–3 record, finishing 5–2 in their conference.

Schedule

Notes

References

Delaware State
Delaware State Hornets football seasons
Delaware State Hornets football